Belter may refer to:

People
Herbert Belter (1929–1951), East German resistance activist
William Belter (1926-1999), American lawyer and politician

Music
 A singer who applies the singing style of vocal belting
 "Belter" (Gerry Cinnamon song) (2017)

Other uses
 Belter (board game), a 1979 board wargame
 Belter, in science fiction, a resident of the Asteroid Belt
 Belter (Niven), a resident of the asteroid belt in Larry Niven's Known Space
 Belter, a resident of the asteroid belt in James S. A. Corey's The Expanse
 Belter Creole, a constructed language made by Nick Farmer for The Expanse

See also
Belt (disambiguation)